Acral necrosis is a symptom common in bubonic plague.  The striking black discoloration of skin and tissue, primarily on the extremities ("acral"), is commonly thought to have given rise to the name "Black Death," associated both with the disease and the pandemic which occurred in the 14th century. The term in fact came from the figural sense of "black", that is ghastly, lugubrious or dreadful.

Acral necrosis may be a symptom of other diseases too. It also has been observed as an adverse event related to a medical treatment.

Clotting and bleeding beneath the skin cause an area of haemorrhage, the presence of red blood cells lying outside of capillaries, into the skin and subcutaneous tissue.  In isolation, this is called an ecchymosis or bruise and may be the result of injury or illness.  However, acral necrosis occurs when blood supply is disrupted for prolonged periods, blackening and damaging the affected area and surrounding tissue.  With appropriate medical treatment, areas with acral necrosis may be successfully restored to function and lead a normal life.  Untreated cases can lead to death.

References

External links
eMedicine site: Description and graphic photographs

Symptoms and signs: Skin and subcutaneous tissue